Iniquity Bloody Iniquity is a compilation album and the final release by Danish death metal band Iniquity released in 2003 before disbanding in 2004. The first three tracks and track 13 and 14 on this album were previously unreleased on CD.

A 20-page booklet also came with the album, it contains photos of the band, a complete discography (including demos) with pictures of each album, and there is a quote from a band member or friend on every page.

Track listing
 "Revel in Cremation" (from Revel in Cremation 7" single) - 4:46
 "Madman of the Trade" (from Revel in Cremation 7" single) - 5:20 
 "Extreme Unction" (Pestilence cover) (previously unreleased) - 1:28 
 "Bloodletting" (from Grime) - 5:28
 "The Bullet's Breath" (from Grime) - 3:50
 "Inhale the Ghost" (from Five Across the Eyes) - 5:23
 "The Rigormortified Grip" (from Five Across the Eyes) - 5:21
 "Cocooned" (from Five Across the Eyes) - 5:08
 "Desiderated Profligacy" (from The Hidden Lore EP) - 5:24
 "The Hidden Lore" (from The Hidden Lore EP) - 5:46
 "Encysted and Dormant" (from Serenadium) - 5:45
 "Retorn" (from The Very Best Of Progress Red Labels compilation album) - 5:19
 "Entangled" (from Promo '93) - 3:47
 "Torn" (from Entering Deception demo tape) - 3:13
 "Prophecy of the Dying Watcher" (Live recorded at Rock Amar, Copenhagen) (from Brutal Youth live compilation album) - 4:24
 "The Bullet's Breath" (Live recorded at Pumpehuset, Copenhagen) (video)

Line-up on different tracks
Track 1-5:
Mads Haarløv - Guitar & vocals
Thomas Fagerlind - Bass
Kræn Meier - Guitar
Jesper Frost Jensen - drums

Track 6-8:
Mads Haarløv - Guitar & Vocals
Thomas Fagerlind - Bass
Brian Eriksen - Guitar
Jesper Frost Jensen - Drums

Track 9-10:
Martin Rosendahl - Bass & Vocals
Jens Lee - Guitar
Brian Eriksen - Guitar
Jesper Frost Jensen - Drums

Track 11:
Brian Petrowsky - Guitar & Vocals
Lars Friis - Guitar
Thomas Christensen - Bass
Jacob Olsen - Drums

Track 12:
Brian Petrowsky - Vocals & Guitar
Mads Haarløv - Vocals & Guitar
Claus Zeeberg - Bass
Carsten Nielsen - Keyboards
Jacob Olsen - Drums

Track 13:
Brian Petrowsky - Guitar & Vocals
Claus Zeeberg - Bass & Acoustic guitar
Carsten Nielsen - Keyboards
Jacob Olsen - Drums

Track 14:
Brian Petrowsky - Guitar & Vocals
Peter Houd - Bass
Morten Hansen - Drums

Track 15:
Brian Petrowsky - Vocals & Guitar
Mads Haarløv - Vocals & Guitar
Claus Zeeberg - Bass
Carsten Nielsen - Keyboards
Jacob Olsen - Drums

Credits
Trey Azagthoth - Quotes Researched & Compiled
Tom Nygaard - Cover Art
Jacob Hansen - Producer
Bjarke Ahlstrand - Digital Mastering, Quotes Researched & Compiled
Michael H. Andersen - Executive Producer, Quotes Researched & Compiled
Ossian Ryner - Digital Mastering, Quotes Researched & Compiled
Phoebus Moreleon - Collage
Daniel Long - Cover Art

2003 compilation albums
Iniquity (band) albums
Albums produced by Jacob Hansen